The Rockefeller Cottage, also known as Indian Mound Cottage, is a house on Jekyll Island, Georgia.  It is next to the Jekyll Island Club. It stands three stories high, and has a total of 25 rooms. There are nine bedrooms, nine bathrooms, and seven servant rooms. The house has many distinguishing features such as an elevator, a cedar-lined walk-in safe, and taps for hot and cold salt water on the bathtub in the master bedroom bath.  Tours of the mansion are provided by the Jekyll Island Museum.

History 
The house was built by Gordon McKay in 1892.  McKay died in 1903 and the house was bought by William Rockefeller in 1905, who used it as a winter home.  It was evacuated in 1942, along with the rest of the island.  The house remained in the Rockefeller family until 1947, when the Jekyll Island Authority bought the property.  It was open as a museum from 1950 until 1968, when it was closed for badly needed repairs.  It is now a public museum. It was added to the National Register of Historic Places in 1971.

Mound 
The house took its original name from a mound in the front yard. The mound was once thought to be an Indian burial ground for the Guale Indians, who were the earliest inhabitants of the island. The mound was later found to be a shell midden left by the Indians.

References

External links
 
 Jekyll Island Museum: History Tours
 Glynn County listing for Indian Mound Cottage
 Jekyll Island - RV travels across North America with Bob and Laura Madigan
 Video of the restored mansion in 2010

Houses on the National Register of Historic Places in Georgia (U.S. state)
Museums in Glynn County, Georgia
Houses in Glynn County, Georgia
Historic house museums in Georgia (U.S. state)
Shingle Style architecture in Georgia (U.S. state)
Houses completed in 1892
1892 establishments in Georgia (U.S. state)
Jekyll Island
Individually listed contributing properties to historic districts on the National Register in Georgia (U.S. state)